The following is an episode list of the TLC series, Sextuplets Take New York.

Series overview

Sextuplets Take New York

Episodes

Specials

Season 1

References

Lists of reality television series episodes